Pick Lake may refer to:

Pick Lake (Cochrane District, Ontario), Canada
Pick Lake (Thunder Bay District, Ontario)

See also
Toothpick Lake, Ontario, Canada